French roads have a variable maximum speed limit that depends on weather conditions. In dry weather rural 2- or 3-lane roads are limited to 80 km/h, 4-lane expressways (in rural areas) 110 km/h, and highways (in rural areas, when classified as motorway) 130 km/h. When raining, the limits are respectively lowered to 80, 100, and 110 km/h. Urban speed limit of 50 km/h is unaffected by weather. The general speed limit is lowered to 50 km/h on all roads in the fog or other low-visibility conditions if visibility is under 50 metres.

Those limits are not systematically signaled as they are the default limit. For instance the name of a town or village at its entry is an implicit limitation to 50 km/h; the crossed name at the exit is the corresponding end of limit. This matches the way 1968 Vienna Convention on Road Traffic defined a built-up area (in English, or agglomération in French). However, additional 50 km/h speed limit signs, or other speed limit sign, might be added to make it more explicit.

Vehicles over 3.5 metric tons of maximum total weight have lower speed limits. Lorries of more than 12 metric tons (except dangerous goods and trailers that may have lower limits) may not exceed 50 km/h in urban areas (even if the speed limit was raised to 70 km/h), 90 km/h on highways, and 80 km/h elsewhere. Lorries under 12 metric tons but over 3.5 have the same limits except 90 km/h on 4-lane expressways. Buses may not exceed 100 km/h on highways and 4-lane expressways.

Minimum or recommended speeds are very rarely marked in France, though vehicles incapable of sustaining 60 km/h are not allowed on highways/motorways and you must be driving at 80 km/h or higher to use the left-most lane of a highway/motorway.

From 1 July 2018, 80 km/h has become the default maximum speed limit on a network of around 400,000 kilometers of road. Protests against the lowering of the speed limit on rural roads to 80 km/h were held due to the unpopularity of the decision, on the assumption that an 80 km/h speed is too slow and that there has been insufficient assessment done. This contributed in French rural areas to the beginning of the "Gilets Jaunes" (Yellow vests movement).

Additional limits to the speed limits

Article R413-17 of the Code de la route provide some clarifications regarding the speed limits.
 It clarifies that speed limits are designed for optimal traffic conditions, clear weather and a vehicle in good condition.
 It clarifies that drivers should adapt their speed to state of the road, traffic conditions and obstacles.
 It clarifies the need to reduce speed when there are pedestrians, cyclists, slow moving or stationary vehicles, stopped convoys, public transport vehicles setting down or picking up travelers, reduced visibility or slippery road, rain or fog, bends, steep descents and narrow streets or roads with residential buildings; at hill brows and junctions with reduced visibility; when using dipped beam at night or in a tunnel and when passing animals.

History and trends

In some cities, 30 km/h is being developed as a common speed limit in zone 30 to provide greater security with pedestrian and cyclists.

In 2005, a governmental report advised lowering the higher highway speed to 115 km/h in order to save fuel and reduce accident risks, but this proposal was badly received. Since 2002, the French government has installed a number of automatic radar guns on autoroutes, routes nationales, and other major thoroughfares. These are in addition to radar manned by the French National Police and the Gendarmerie. The French authorities have credited this increase in traffic enforcement with a 50% drop in road fatalities from 2002 to 2006 (except on Motorways, where the fatalities rose by 15% between 2002 and 2006).

2018, the 80 km/h experiment
On 9 January 2018 the national government announced 80 km/h (instead of 90) as a standard speed limit on secondary network, due to the many fatalities still happening on these roads. This was after experimentation which included a speed limit change from 90 to 80 between 2010-2015 and 2015-2017 which resulted in a reduction in road fatalities. The 80 km/h national limit entered into force on 1 July 2018.

Preliminary ONISR results of July 2018 shows a decrease of fatalities between July 2017 and July 2018:
 fatality decrease of 5.5% in France and 6% in mainland.
 injured decrease of 2.1%.
 24 hours hospitalization decrease of 10.5%.
 increase of 0.9% of accidents with injuries.

Preliminary ONISR results of August 2018 showed a further decrease in fatalities between August 2017 and August 2018:
 fatality decrease of 15.5% in mainland France (46 saved lives); fatality decrease of 30.4% in oversea France (7 saved lives)
 injured decrease of 2.1% in mainland France.
 24 hours hospitalization decrease of 13.3% in mainland France; 24 hours hospitalization decrease of 9.0% in oversea France
 decrease of 3.2% of accidents with injuries in mainland France.

In August, some people painted speed cameras to protest against 80 km/h speed limit as they were angry.

According to a RAC representative 

Pierre Chasseray, General Delegate of the association "40 million motorists", criticised the measure as undemocratic and for the lack of transparency on road fatalities.

Chantal Perrichon, President of the League against Roadad Violence, supported the governmental initiative as a measure required to save lives, but she is also criticised of the lack of transparency as the government did not publish data related to fatalities.

2019, the 80 km/h experiment result (second semester 2018)

Preliminary statistics available in January 2019, consider the year 2018 have been the best year for France, with only around 3,259 people killed in mainland France, not including people killed overseas.

Such a number means 116 lives have been saved in the second semester 2018, compared to the average from 2013 to 2017.

However, the preliminary result accuracy is not exact, as in the previous years difference with definitive results (the error) was 21 killed people in 2017, and 18 in 2013.

According to the ONISR: "For the first time, the fatality rate per million inhabitants in France mainland is below 50, with 49 deaths estimated per million inhabitants in 2018, a decrease by -3.7% compared to 2013, the best year to date."

After few months of success in saving lives, yellow vest have vandalized speed camera leading to an increase of speed, and an increase in fatalities.

In May 2019, Prime Minister Edouard Philippe agreed to make the choice between a 90 km/h and an 80 km/h speed limit a local decision.

The same month, ONISR provides definitive results:
 3248 people killed in 2018, in France métropolitaine, and 144 in oversea départements, making a grand total of 3488 for France entière. This is the best result ever in France since centralized fatalities records began in France in 1953
 With this result 200 lives were saved compared to 2017, 
 With this result 127 lives were saved on the second semester on the rural 80 km/h network, while 15 lives were saved on the remaining networks (motorway + urban).

2019, the 80 km/h experiment first year result

During the first year 206 lives haves been saved. This result is published in  "Bilan à 12 mois de la mesure d'abaissement de la vitesse maximale autorisée à 80 km/h sur le réseau bidirectionnel", comparing against the 2013-2017 mean, the 1945 people killed from July 2018 to June 2019 on the rural non-motorway network, whiles fatalities increased by 37 killed people on the remaining network. This means that fatalities were 11% higher during those previous five years.

2020, the 80 km/h experiment final result

The final report ending the two years of experiment of the 80 km/h maximum speed limit showed 349 lives have been saved according to Cerema publication.

Cerema analysis focused on several results, including real speed, accidents, cultural acceptation, and other socia effects.

The car speed limit change induced a 3.5 km/h decrease for cars and a 1.8 km/h decrease for trucks.

The speed limit change did not change the short distances between vehicles which remain as short (less than two seconds) or very short (less than one second):
 25% of cars and 6% of HGV had a short distance (less than two seconds)
 7% of cars and 1% of HGV had a very short distance (less than one second).

Final fatality was not computed on a 24 months (two years) period but on a 20 months period where 349 lives were saved between July 2018 and February 2020 due lives saved by traffic reduction induced by a COVID-19 lock-down effect between March 2020 and June 2020.

Speed limit change helped the French to save 700 euros millions including 1200 in accidents and 300 millions in gasoline while 800 euro millions were lost in lost time.

2020, development of the 90 km/h speed limit 

In 2020, the Haute-Marne département started the first 90 km/h speed limit of France on regular roads.

Cities with wide 30 km/h speed limit

Grenoble, Lille and Nantes have 30 km/h default limits.

Paris will extend 30 km/h limits to cover the entire city from 2021, except the ring road and pedestrianised areas.

References and Sources

Sécurité Routière, Ministère de l'Écologie, de l'Énergie, du Développement durable et de la Mer, Délégation à la sécurité et à la circulation routières, RCS paris b 562 111 732, July 2009.
Decree n°73-1073 or the "Code de la route", 3 December 1973, Journal Officiel, page 12844.
Code de la route (available at www.legifrance.gouv.fr):
Article R413-2
Article R413-4
Article R413-3

France
Road transport in France